Mata'afa Iosefo (1832 – 6 February 1912) was a Paramount Chief of Samoa who was one of the three rival candidates for the kingship of Samoa during colonialism. He was also referred to as Tupua Malietoa To'oa Mata'afa Iosefo. He was crowned the King of Samoa on 15 November 1898.

History
The matai chiefly title Mata'afa is one of highest titles in Samoa.
From the late 19th century, Iosefo (first name) played a pivotal role during the country's colonial era when Germany, Great Britain and the United States were vying for control of the Samoa Islands. Each western power had their own chiefly candidate for the 'kingship' of Samoa, and Mata'afa was Germany's preferred candidate.

In the late 19th century, Mata'afa Iosefo was exiled to the Marshall Islands and was permitted to return in 1898. The Germans upheld his claim for the kingship.

First Samoan Civil War
Mata'afa Iosefo first came into prominence in September 1888 when under his command, his followers rebelled against the German-backed Tamasese who was proclaimed Tafa'ifa or King of Samoa. A battle of the First Samoan Civil War saw Mata'afa's warriors send Tamasese's forces retreating to Mulinu'u Point where a German gunship offered protection. The ensuing bombardment of his villages saw Mata'afa retaliate by wiping out an invading German contingent and plundering the German plantations at the First Battle of Vailele. Eventually, Germany, the United States and Britain agreed that Malietoa Laupepa would be restored as the Malietoa and Tafa'ifa of Samoa

Second Samoan Civil War
He was a major protagonist in the Second Samoan Civil War, an important proxy conflict in the leadup to the outbreak of World War I. During the conflict, his followers waged a bloody conflict with German support against  Malietoa Tanumafili I, who was in turn supported by Western Allied forces from the United States and the British Empire. The war dragged on for several months, in which Mata'afa and his allies won or drew several battles at heavy cost, including the Second Battle of Vailele in which the Mataafans defeated Samoan loyalists and a squadron of British and American warships, though suffering casualties both far larger than his opponents and extremely heavy by  the standards of Samoan warfare.

His push for the kingship of Samoa was also supported by the early Mau movement led by orator Lauaki Namulauulu Mamoe.  In the end,   he was able to resist all attempts by the Allies to capture or kill him. As a result, the division of Samoa was agreed as a compromise. Germany obtained the western islands and created German Samoa, the U.S. annexed the eastern islands and created American Samoa, and the British withdrew their claim in exchange for concessions in the Solomon Islands.

In 1900,  Iosefo was declared Ali'i Sili (highest chief) by the German Samoa colonial powers. Iosefo succeeded his father, Mata'afa Tafagamanu, to the Mata'afa title.

Death
Following his death at Mulinu'u in 1912, he was succeeded by Mata'afa Tupuola Iose.

See also

Mata'afa
Fa'amatai, chiefly system of Samoa.

References

Samoan chiefs
1832 births
1912 deaths
Samoan exiles
First Samoan Civil War
Second Samoan Civil War
German Samoa
1880s in Samoa
1890s in Samoa
1900s in Samoa
1910s in Samoa